The Stone House is an historic house at 15-17 Plain Street in Taunton, Massachusetts.  Built in 1847, this -story stone structure is one of only two stone houses built in Taunton in the 19th century.  Its walls are fashioned out of coursed granite, and it has a single-story porch across its front facade, supported by stone piers.  It was operated as a hostelry for seamen in the employ of some of Taunton's shipping magnates.

The house was listed on the National Register of Historic Places in 1984.

See also
National Register of Historic Places listings in Taunton, Massachusetts

References

Houses completed in 1847
Houses in Taunton, Massachusetts
National Register of Historic Places in Taunton, Massachusetts
1847 establishments in Massachusetts
Houses on the National Register of Historic Places in Bristol County, Massachusetts